Siraj Uddin Ahmed (born 14 October 1941) a Bangladeshi former government official, writer, politician and freedom fighter. He was awarded the Independence Award in 2022 for his contribution to the war of independence and liberation.

Early life 
Ahmed was born on 14 October 1941 in the village of Arjikalikapur in Babuganj, Barisal. His father's name was Jahan Uddin Fakir and his mother's name was Laily Begum. He obtained his matriculation from Sayestabad MH Secondary School in 1956, higher secondary and BA degree from Barisal BM College. He obtained MA in economics from University of Dhaka in 1962 and BL degree in 1968. His wife is Begum Firaeza. The couple has two children, Shahriar Ahmed Shilpi and Shakil Ahmed Bhaskar.

Career 
Ahmed was the coordinator of Barguna District Struggle Committee in 1971. In 1975, he was the SDO of Barguna subdivision. He served as Deputy Secretary in the Ministry of Finance, Joint Secretary in the Ministry of Women and Children Affairs, Additional Secretary in the Ministry of Education, Executive Chairman of the Board of Investment and a member of the Bangladesh Public Service Commission. He is the advisor of Barisal district Awami League.

Award 
 Independence Award (2022)

References 

Living people
1941 births
People from Barisal District
Bangladeshi civil servants
Bangladeshi writers
University of Dhaka alumni
Brojomohun College alumni
Awami League politicians
People of the Bangladesh Liberation War

Recipients of the Independence Day Award